The Guodian Chu Slips were unearthed in 1993 in Tomb no. 1 of the Guodian tombs in Jingmen, Hubei Province and dated to the latter half of the Warring States period.

The tomb is located in the Jishan District's tomb complex, near the Jingmen City in the village of Guodian, and only nine kilometers north of Ying, which was the ancient Chu capital from about 676 BC until 278 BC, before the State of Chu was overrun by Qin. The tomb and its contents were studied to determine the identity of the occupant; an elderly noble scholar, and teacher to a royal prince. The prince had been identified as Crown Prince Heng, who later became King Qingxiang of Chu. Since King Qingxiang was the Chu king when Qin sacked their old capital Ying in 278 BC, the Chu slips are dated to around 300 BC.

Content
There are in total about 804 bamboo slips in this cache, including 702 strips and 27 broken strips. The bamboo slip texts consist of three major categories, which include the earliest manuscripts of the received text of the Tao Te Ching, one chapter from the Classic of Rites, content from the Classic of History and other writings. After restoration, these texts were divided into eighteen sections, and have been transcribed into standard Chinese and published under the title Chu Bamboo Slips from Guodian in May 1998. The slip-texts include both Taoist and Confucian works, many previously unknown, and the discovery of these texts in the same tomb has contributed fresh information for scholars studying the history of philosophical thought in ancient China. According to Gao Zheng from the Institute of Philosophy of the Chinese Academy of Social Sciences, the main part could have been teaching material used by the Confucianist Si Meng scholars of the Jixia Academy in the State of Qi. Qu Yuan, who was sent as an envoy to Qi, might have taken them back to Chu.

Recent scholarship has questioned the value of categorizing works that date prior to pre-Han as strictly Confucian or Taoist. These categories only appeared during the Han and do not relate in any meaningful way to Guodian. The diversity of views represented in the tomb is a perfect example of the blurring of these lines.

Categories

See also
 Chu Silk Manuscript
 Mawangdui Silk Texts
 Shuanggudui
 Shuihudi Qin bamboo texts
 Taiyi Shengshui
 Tsinghua Slips
 Yinqueshan Han Slips
 Zhangjiashan Han bamboo texts

References

External links
Ancient script rewrites history, Harvard University Gazette

Database of Selected Characters from Guodian and Mawangdui Manuscripts, Matthias Richter
 欢迎您光临简帛研究网站, BambooSilk.Org website for research on the Guodian texts
Guodian Slips - photos and definitions

4th-century BC manuscripts
3rd-century BC manuscripts
1993 archaeological discoveries
Bamboo and wooden slips
Archaeological artifacts of China
Chu (state)
History of Hubei